Heinrich Happe (December 31, 1894 – January 12, 1979) was a German politician of the Social Democratic Party (SPD) and member of the German Bundestag.

Life 
He was a member of the German Bundestag during the first legislative period from 1949 to 1953. He had entered parliament via the North Rhine-Westphalia state list.

Literature

References

1894 births
1979 deaths
Members of the Bundestag for North Rhine-Westphalia
Members of the Bundestag 1949–1953
Members of the Bundestag for the Social Democratic Party of Germany